Ulricehamn Municipality (Ulricehamns kommun) is a municipality in Västra Götaland County in western Sweden. Its seat is located in the city of Ulricehamn.

The present municipality was created in 1974 when the former City of Ulricehamn was merged with three former rural municipalities (themselves established through amalgamations of minor units in 1952).

Localities
Blidsberg
Dalum
Gällstad
Hulu
Hökerum
Marbäck
Nitta
Rånnaväg
Timmele
Trädet
Ulricehamn (seat)
Vegby
Älmestad

References

External links

Ulricehamn Municipality - Official site
Ulricehamn Tourism - In Swedish, English and German
 Article Ulricehamn - From Nordisk Familjebok

Municipalities of Västra Götaland County
South Älvsborg